Dhaka Polytechnic Institute (also known as DPI) is a government technical institute in Dhaka, Bangladesh. It is the largest and the oldest polytechnic academia in modern Bangladesh. The polytechnic is ranked number one on the Bangladesh Polytechnic Ranking 2018.

History 

"East Pakistan Polytechnic Institute, Dacca" was established in May 1955 by Oklahoma State University-Stillwater with funding from the Ford Foundation. By the mid-1960s, it had become "Dacca Polytechnic Institute".

Directorates 
The institute operates under the executive control of the Ministry of Education acting through the Directorate of Technical Education. The academic programs and curricula are maintained under the regulation of the Bangladesh Technical Education Board (BTEB). BTEB functions under the Directorate of Inspection and Audit, which in turn functions under Chief Accounts Office.

Campus 

The main campus is a large four-storied building. A branch of the Sonali Bank has been established for the DPI students' banking facilities, which is located at the northern corner of the main building. A large auditorium is also located inside the main campus for various events and cultural activities. The southern corner houses a Shaheed Minar.

Workshop 
A large well-equipped workshop is located on the main campus to enhance students' practical skills. Practical classes for Electrical, Mechanical, Civil, Automobile and Refrigeration, Chemical, and Chemical (Food) are frequently held in the workshop.

Library 
DPI library
has a collection of 20,000 books and 10,000+ bound periodicals. Besides, 37 titles are in the current subscription list of journals. The main reading room of central library can accommodate 100 students at a time to provide reading facilities of rare and out of print books, ready reference and prescribed textbooks.

Medical center 
The institute has a medical facility with a full-time medical officer (Diploma in Pharmacy) and other supporting staff. The center provides free treatment to the students and faculty.

Dhaka Polytechnic Post Office 
Dhaka Polytechnic Post office is a famous post office at Tejgaon. It's located at Battala mor just after the workshop building.

Stadium 
DPI has a stadium located close to Tejgaon Nabisco junction. The stadium is a venue for different kinds of events and matches including physical education classes for DPI students.

Cafeteria and gymnasium 

There is a cafeteria within the institute premises for light refreshment of students, staff and teachers;the institute possesses a gymnasium equipped with necessary facilities.

Hostels 

Dhaka Polytechnic Institute has following hostels:

 Latif Hostel (It has two sections: East and West).
 

 Dr. Kazi Motahar Hossain Hostel
 Zahir Raihan Hostel
 Maniruzzaman Hostel - Reserved for teachers
 Kazi Nazrul Islam Hostel - Leased to Bangladesh Institute of Glass and Ceramics
 Aziz Hostel - Leased to Bangladesh University of Textiles (BUTEX)
 Ladies Hostel

Quarters 
 Dhaka Polytechnic Staff Quarter
 Dhaka Polytechnic Teacher's Quarter

Contiguous College & school 
  Technical Teachers’ Training College (1960-1966)
 Dhaka Polytechnic Laboratory School (established in 1994), beside Latif Hostel

Dhaka Polytechnic Institute Central Mosque 
Dhaka Polytechnic Institute has a central mosque just
beside the main building. It also has a two-storey mosque beside the Latif Hostel. Also, has a market named Dhaka Polytechnic Mosque Market (near BITAC).

Dhaka Polytechnic Institute playground 
Dhaka Polytechnic Institute Playground is so small that students can play only volleyball and cricket. It is not a big ground so students can not play properly.

Grading system 
The academic year consists of eight semesters. Academic courses are based on a credit system. Each semester held 6 months. First 7 semesters based on academic education and last semester is Industrial Attachment (6 month).

Academics 
Dhaka Polytechnic Institute has the following departments of technology:
 Faculty of Civil Engineering
 Department of Civil Engineering
 Department of Architectural engineering
 Department of Environmental Engineering
 Faculty of Mechanical Engineering
 Department of Mechanical Engineering
 Department of Chemical Engineering
 Department of Food Engineering
 Faculty of Electrical and Electronic Engineering
 Department of Electrical Engineering
 Department of Electronics Engineering
 Department of Computer Engineering
 Department of Power Engineering (Automobile & RAC)

 NonTech Department

Short designation 
 Competency Based Training & Assessment (CBT&A) Under NTVQF
 Trade Courses (operates various departments)

Student organizations 
 
 

 DPI Rover Scout Group
 DPI Sports Association
 DPI Drama Society
 DPI Photography Society
 House of Volunteers: DPI
 DPI Blood Donation
 DPI Debating Club
 DPI Journalist Society
 Team Karigor - An Innovative Team of Dhaka Polytechnic Institute
 DPI IT Society
 DPI Cultural Club
 Dhaka Polytechnic Alumni Association

Notable alumni 
 Sultanuddin Ahmed, engineer, principal, instructor 
 Mamunur Rashid, theater activist

Gallery 

Shaheed Minar in DPI campus

 Bangabandhu Chottor

 DPI Auditorium

 DPI North Gate

 DPI South Gate

See also 

 Bogra Polytechnic Institute
 Chandpur Polytechnic Institute
 Chittagong Polytechnic Institute
 Dinajpur Polytechnic Institute
 Faridpur Polytechnic Institute
 Feni Polytechnic Institute
 Jessore Polytechnic Institute
 Khulna Polytechnic Institute

References

External links 

 Official Website

Colleges in Bangladesh
Universities and colleges in Dhaka
Educational institutions established in 1955
1955 establishments in East Pakistan
Polytechnic institutes in Bangladesh
Technological institutes of Bangladesh